A ribbon Hopf algebra  is a quasitriangular Hopf algebra which possess an invertible central element  more commonly known as the ribbon element, such that the following conditions hold:

where .  Note that the element u exists for any quasitriangular Hopf algebra, and
 must always be central and satisfies , so that all that is required is that it have a central square root with the above properties.

Here
 is a vector space
 is the multiplication map 
 is the co-product map 
 is the unit operator 
 is the co-unit operator 
 is the antipode 
 is a universal R matrix

We assume that the underlying field  is 

If  is finite-dimensional, one could equivalently call it ribbon Hopf if and only if its category of (say, left) modules is ribbon; if  is finite-dimensional and quasi-triangular, then it is ribbon if and only if its category of (say, left) modules is pivotal.

See also 
Quasitriangular Hopf algebra
Quasi-triangular quasi-Hopf algebra

References 

Hopf algebras